The Alexandria Protocol was an agreement signed on 7 October 1944, in Alexandria, by five Arab countries agreeing to the formation of a joint Arab Organization, which led to the formation of the League of Arab States in the following year.

The agreement stated that all participating countries will be represented on an equal footing. The main aim of this organization was to strengthen the relations between Arab states and to participate actively in the coordination of their political plans and foreign policy without interference with their independence but promising protection by suitable means in case of aggression against a member state and its sovereignty.

The meeting in Alexandria included five committees with representatives of the future members of the Arab League countries in the Middle East.

Founding members 
  Egypt: Nagib al-Hilali Pasha, Minister of Education, Muhammad Sabri Abu 'Alam Pasha, Minister of - Justice, Muhammad Salah-al-din Bey, Under Secretary of State of the Ministry of Foreign Affairs,
  Iraq: Hamdi al-Bahjaji, Iraqi Prime Minister and head of the Iraqi delegation, Arshad al-'Umari, Minister of Foreign Affairs, Nuri al-Sa'id, former Iraqi Prime Minister, Tahein al-'Askari, Iraqi Minister Plenipotentiary in Egypt
  Syria: Saadallah al-Jabiri, Syrian Prime Minister and head of the Syrian delegation, Jamil Mardam Bey, Minister of Foreign Affairs, Dr. Nagib al-Armanazi, Secretary General of the Presidency of the Syrian Republic, M. Sabri al-Assali, deputy of Damascus.
  (then Transjordan): Tawfiq Abu al-Huda Pasha, Trans-Jordanian Prime Minister and Minister Of Foreign Affairs, head of the Trans-Jordanian delegation, Sulayman al-Sukkar Bey, Financial Secretary of the Ministry of Foreign Affairs.
: with the president Bechara El Khoury, Riyad al-Sulh Bey, Lebanese Prime Minister and head of the Lebanese delegation, Salim Taqla Bey, Minister of Foreign Affairs, Musa Mubarak, Chief of the Presidential Cabinet.

See also 
 Charter of the Arab League

References

External links
The Avalon Project : The Alexandria Protocol; October 7, 1944

Arab League
1944 in politics
Treaties concluded in 1944
Treaties of the Kingdom of Iraq
Treaties of Jordan
Treaties of Lebanon
Treaties of the Syrian Republic (1930–1963)
Treaties of the Kingdom of Egypt
1944 in Egypt

fr:Protocole d'Alexandrie